ACC Regular season Co Champions

The 1994–95 Virginia Cavaliers men's basketball team represented University of Virginia as a member of the Atlantic Coast Conference during the 1994–95 NCAA Division I men's basketball season. The team was led by third-year head coach Jeff Jones. The Cavaliers earned an at-large bid to the NCAA tournament as No. 4 seed in the East region. They defeated  in the opening round, No. 12 seed Miami (OH) in the second round, and Kansas to reach the Elite Eight before falling to No. 2 seed Arkansas. The Cavaliers finished with a record of 25–9 (12–4 ACC).

Roster

Schedule and results

|-
!colspan=9 style=| Regular season

|-
!colspan=9 style=| ACC Tournament

|-
!colspan=9 style=| NCAA tournament

Rankings

References

Virginia Cavaliers men's basketball seasons
Virginia
Virginia
Virgin
Virgin